The Orbieu is an  long river in the Aude département, in south central France. Its source is at Fourtou, in the Corbières Massif. It flows generally northeast.

Communes along its course
This list is ordered from source to mouth: Fourtou, Auriac, Lanet, Montjoi, Vignevieille, Mayronnes, Saint-Martin-des-Puits, Saint-Pierre-des-Champs, Lagrasse, Ribaute, Camplong-d'Aude, Fabrezan, Ferrals-les-Corbières, Lézignan-Corbières, Luc-sur-Orbieu, Cruscades, Ornaisons, Névian, Villedaigne, Raissac-d'Aude, Marcorignan

References

Rivers of France
Rivers of Aude
1Orbieu
Rivers of Occitania (administrative region)